The developmentalist configuration is a socio-anthropological term used in development studies to describe the nature of "development." The term was coined by Jean-Pierre Olivier de Sardan and is used by post-development theorists, postcolonialists, critical theorists and others. The term describes the paradigm of governments, NGOs, individuals and researchers who seek to progress the "development" of a country through cosmopolitan ideals which bring about social change.

Jean-Pierre Olivier de Sardan describes "developmentalist configuration" as:

References

 Atlani-Duault, Laëtitia 2007, Humanitarian Aid in Post-Soviet Countries: An Anthropological Perspective, Psychology Press
http://nuevomundo.revues.org/56724
Xianga, Rong & Luka, Tak-Chuen 2011, "Friends or foes? Social enterprise and women organizing in migrant communities of China", China Journal of Social Work, Vol. 4, No. 3, pp. 255–270, <www.tandfonline.com/doi/abs/10.1080/17525098.2011.620698>
Lewis, David, Mosse, David 2006, Development Brokers And Translators: The Ethnography of Aid And Agencies, Kumarian Press

Configuration